Banbirpur also spelled as Banveer Pur is a village near Tikunia in Lakhimpur Kheri district, Uttar Pradesh, India.

History 
In 2021, Lakhimpur Kheri violence occurred on the Tikonia-Banbirpur road near Banbirpur village in the Tikunia area. It was a vehicle-ramming attack and mob lynching incident during farmers’ protest against the three farm laws passed by the BJP led Union Government. It happened on 3 October 2021 at Tikunia in Lakhimpur Kheri district, Uttar Pradesh, India resulting in deaths of eight people and injuries to 10 others. Four protesters and a journalist were run over by the car, three others were killed in the subsequent violence. Two First information reports (FIR) on the incident were filed in the Tikunia police station.

Demographics

Population
The town had a population of 5,578 in 2011. Male population of 2,952 and 2,626 females. There were 1101 households in the village.

Administration and politics
The village is part of the Nighasan (Assembly constituency). Shashank Verma of BJP is the MLA from the constituency since the 2019 bye polls.

Services
Tikunia police station serves the area.

Transport
Tikonia-Banbirpur road connects the village with Tikunia nagar panchayat.

References

Villages in Lakhimpur Kheri district